The Ministry of Petroleum (MOP) manages the oil industry, the producer of oil and petrochemical products. MoP is in charge of all issues pertaining to exploration, extraction, exploitation, distribution and exportation of crude oil and oil products. In addition, according to the "Imports and Exports Regulation Act", issuing import licenses for such products is also among the functions of the Ministry of Petroleum. The ministry has been placed under sanctions by the United States Department of State as of 2020.

According to BP, Iran's has  of proven oil reserves and 29.61 trillion cubic meters of proven gas reserves. Iran ranks third in the world in oil reserves and second in gas reserves. It is responsible for applying the principle of Iranian ownership and sovereignty over oil and gas reserves. Also, it is undertake the separation of sovereignty tasks from management and development of country's oil and gas industry.

The Ministry of petroleum was established after revolution in Iran and in the interim government of Bazargan, after departure of Hasan Nazia, the managing director of National Iranian Oil Company from the country in 1979. The organizational structure of this ministry consists of a central headquarters and four subsidiaries, including National Iranian Oil Company, National Iranian Gas Company, National Iranian Petrochemical Company and National Iranian Oil Refining and Distribution Company. It monitors the operations of exploration, extraction, marketing and sale of crude oil, natural gas and oil products in the country through its subsidiaries and subsidiaries. In addition to meeting its major energy needs, the ministry supplies over 80% of foreign currency earnings by exporting crude oil and refined petroleum products.

According to the Fourth Economic, Social and Cultural Development Plan, the Government has been required to transfer at least 10% of the activities related to the exploration, extraction and production of crude oil to the private sector, while in the meantime retaining its ownership of oil resources. This is also the case in other fields of the Ministry of Petroleum's activities.

Iran plans to invest $500 billion in the oil sector until 2025. As of 2010, US$70 billion worth of oil and gas projects were under construction. Iran's annual oil and gas revenues were expected to reach $250 billion by 2015.

History 
The Ministry of petroleum of Islamic Republic of Iran was formed with the aim of applying the principle of Iranian national ownership and sovereignty to oil and gas resources, and separating sovereignty functions from company in the management and development of oil and gas industry of the country. Since the petroleum industry has a special role in the country's economy as a propellant industry and plays a key role in achieving the major goals of national economy, the ministry's performance is very important.

Iran holds 836.47 billion barrels of liquid hydrocarbon reserves (crude oil, liquids and gas condensate) and about 34 trillion gas reserves. It is ranked first in the world in terms of having a total hydrocarbon reserves and in terms of energy security in the world. Also, the privileges like geopolitical position of the country and availability of powerful human capital have given it more strength.

The National Petroleum Procurement Proposal was signed by 17 representatives of National Petroleum Commission on 8 December 1950. In the text of message was following: "we are proposing for Iranian oil industry to be announced in all regions of the country without exception under the name of well-being of Iranian people and in order to contribute to peace of the world: all exploration, extraction and exploitation operations be in the control of government."

Following the announcement of this proposal, "the law of oil Nationalization throughout the country and two-month extension to Petroleum Commission to study around implementation of this principle" passed in National Assembly and eventually in the Senate on 29 March 1950. Thus, The National Iranian Oil Company was established.

First board of directors of National Iranian Oil Company was constituted by implementing the law of oil industry nationalization and after expropriation of former British oil company in June 1951. Then, new rules were adopted for this new company.

The legal framework for activities of National Iranian Oil Company in discussion of hydrocarbons sources and its products was determined by approving the "Law on Development of Petrochemical Industries (with subsequent amendments)" on 20 July 1965 and the "Law on Development of Gas Industry" on 25 May 1972. In addition, the extent of Iranian or foreign companies and firms has clarified to participate in petrochemical product plans.

Finally, a detailed description of presenting and receiving proposals, signing contracts, contract termination, conservation and preventing environmental pollution, maintaining Iran's interests and pricing conditions were presented by the approval of first "Oil Act" on 8 August 1974, in addition to defining the terms and conditions of work within hydrocarbon resources of whole country.

Upon approval of first "Oil Act", the "Law on Statute of National Iranian Oil Company" was ratified in five seasons on 17 May 1977.

"General and capital", "subject, duties, rights and authorities of company", "the entity of company", "balance sheet and profit and loss account" have formed first four chapters of the statute. In the fifth chapter of this law is also addressed to "other regulations".

Subsequently, the "Statute of National Petrochemical Company" and "Statute of National Iranian Gas Company" were approved on 21 November, and 25 November 1977, respectively.

After Islamic Revolution of Iran, the editing and approval of new laws were also on the agenda of Islamic Consultative Assembly with the necessity of following some principles and with regard to departure of foreign experts. Hence, new oil law was approved on 9 October 1987.

Oil law 
Following the announcement of this proposal, "the law of oil Nationalization throughout the country and two-month extension to Petroleum Commission to study around implementation of this principle" passed in National Assembly and eventually in the Senate on 29 March 1950. Thus, The National Iranian Oil Company was established.

First board of directors of National Iranian Oil Company was constituted by implementing the law of oil industry nationalization and after expropriation of former British oil company in June 1951. Then, new rules were adopted for this new company.

The legal framework for activities of National Iranian Oil Company in discussion of hydrocarbons sources and its products was determined by approving the "Law on Development of Petrochemical Industries (with subsequent amendments)" on 20 July 1965 and the "Law on Development of Gas Industry" on 25 May 1972. In addition, the extent of Iranian or foreign companies and firms has clarified to participate in petrochemical product plans.

Finally, a detailed description of presenting and receiving proposals, signing contracts, contract termination, conservation and preventing environmental pollution, maintaining Iran's interests and pricing conditions were presented by the approval of first "Oil Act" on 8 August 1974, in addition to defining the terms and conditions of work within hydrocarbon resources of whole country.

Upon approval of first "Oil Act", the "Law on Statute of National Iranian Oil Company" was ratified in five seasons on 17 May 1977.

"General and capital", "subject, duties, rights and authorities of company", "the entity of company", "balance sheet and profit and loss account" have formed first four chapters of the statute. In the fifth chapter of this law is also addressed to "other regulations".

Subsequently, the "Statute of National Petrochemical Company" and "Statute of National Iranian Gas Company" were approved on 21 November, and 25 November 1977, respectively.

After Islamic Revolution of Iran, the editing and approval of new laws were also on the agenda of Islamic Consultative Assembly with the necessity of following some principles and with regard to departure of foreign experts. Hence, new oil law was approved on 9 October 1987.

Ministers

Constitution

The Iranian constitution prohibits the granting of petroleum rights on a concessionary basis or direct equity stake. However, the 1987 Petroleum Law permits the establishment of contracts between the ministry, state companies and "local and foreign national persons and legal entities." Buyback contracts, for instance, are arrangements in which the contractor funds all investments, receives remuneration from the National Iranian Oil Company (NIOC) in the form of an allocated production share, then transfers operation of the field to NIOC after a set number of years, at which time the contract is completed.

Since the 1979 revolution in Iran, the country has been under constant US unilateral sanctions. The first U.S. sanctions against Iran were formalized in November 1979, and during the hostage crisis, many sanctions were leveled against the Iranian government. By 1987 the import of Iranian goods into the United States had been banned. In 1995, President of the United States Bill Clinton issued Executive Order 12957, banning U.S. investment in Iran's energy sector, followed a few weeks later by Executive Order 12959 eliminating all trade and investment and virtually all interaction between the United States and Iran.

Specifically the ministry has been on the sanction list of the European Union since 16 October 2012.

Fifth Development Plan

Features of fifth development plan in oil industry 
The features of fifth development plan in oil industry include: a systemic template of a set of interconnected components that interact with each other to exchange data, information, materials and products, and they perform a targeted move. Also, different parts of the plan have been coordinated and have been seen as a value chain in industry as a whole.

The major goals of Iran's oil and gas industry in fifth development plan 
Objective 1: increase the share and improve position of oil, gas and petrochemical industry in the region and the world, to increase extraction of oil and gas with priority of common fields with neighboring countries, increasing refining capacity

Objective 2: Optimum use of hydrocarbon reserves of the country as backing and stimulus for sustainable economic development of the country.

Objective 3: Use of oil and gas industry capacity to defend national interest

Objective 4: Implement energy management to prevent waste in the country's fuel consumption, reducing energy intensity and granting targeted subsidies

Objective 5: Establishing effective and constructive interaction with energy producer and consumer countries; playing management role of Iran in energy distribution and transit.

Objective 6: Realizing the general policies of article 44 of the constitution in oil industry

Objective 7: Achieve advanced technology in oil, gas and petrochemical industries to reach the second position of science and technology in the region.

Objective 8: Changing the look to oil and gas and its revenues, from source of public funding to "economic productive resources and capitals"

Objective 9: Increase productivity in various sectors of oil industry in order to grow GDP (Gross Domestic Product)

Subsidiaries

National Iranian Oil Company
National Iranian Oil Company (NIOC) is in charge of oil and gas exploration and production, processing and oil transportation.
National Iranian South Oil Company (NISOC) is an important subsidiary of NIOC. NISOC is producing about 83% percent of all crude oil and 16% percent of natural gas produced in Iran.

National Iranian Oil Company subsidiaries:
 National Iranian South Oilfields Company (NISOC)
 Iranian Central Oilfields Company (ICOFC)
 Pars Oil and Gas company
 Petroleum Engineering and Development Co. (PEDEC)
 Iranian Offshore Oil Company

National Iranian Gas Company
National Iranian Gas Company (NIGC) manages gathering, treatment, processing, transmission, distribution, and exports of gas and gas liquids.

The huge reserves of natural gas put Iran in the second place, in terms of the natural gas reserve quantity, among other countries, only next to the Russian Federation, with an estimate of proven reserve quantity close to 23 bcm. Iran's gas reserves are exploited primarily for domestic use.

National Iranian Petrochemical Company 
National Iranian Petrochemical Company (NPC) handles petrochemical production, distribution, and exports. National Iranian Petrochemical Company's output capacity will increase to over 100 million tpa by 2015 from an estimated 50 million tpa in 2010 thus becoming the world' second largest chemical producer globally after Dow Chemical with Iran housing some of the world's largest chemical complexes.

National Iranian Oil Refining and Distribution Company
National Iranian Oil Refining and Distribution Company (NIORDC) handles oil refining and transportation, with some overlap to NIOC.

Abundance of basic material, like natural gas, in the country provide favorable conditions for development and expansion of petrochemical plants.

Production companies 
 National Iranian South Oilfields Company (NISOC)
 Karoun oil and gas exploitation company
 Maroon Oil and Gas Company
 Masjed Soleyman Oil and Gas Company 
 Gachsaran Oil and Gas Company
 Aghajari exploitation Company
 Iranian Central Oilfields Company (ICOFC)
 West Gas & Oil exploitation Company
 East Oil and Gas exploitation Company
 Southern Zagros Oil and Gas Company
 Iranian Offshore Oil Company
 Pars Oil and Gas company
 Arvandan Oil & Gas Co.

Technical Services Companies 
 National Iranian Drilling Company
 Petroleum Engineering and Development Co.
 Iranian Oil Terminals Company
 Pars Special Economic Zone
 Naftiran Intertrade Company (Nico)
 Iran fuel conservation optimization company

Revenues from crude oil

Iran's total revenues from the sale of oil amounted to $77 billion in Iranian year 1387 (2008–09). The average sale price of Iran's crude oil during that year was $100 per barrel. Of this amount, 55% was exported and the remainder was consumed domestically. As of 2010, oil income accounts for 80% of Iran's foreign currency revenues and 60% of the nation's overall budget.
Japan, China, South Africa, Brazil, Pakistan, Sri Lanka, Spain, India and the Netherlands are the main importers of Iran's crude oil. Iran's annual oil revenues reached $100 billion in 2011. Iran's annual oil and gas revenues are expected to reach $250 billion by 2015, including $100 billion from Iran's South Pars giant gas field.

Alleged missing oil revenues 

Oil revenues: Foreign currency proceeds from crude sales are managed by the Central Bank. According to Farda newspaper, the difference between President Ahmadinejad administration's revenues and the amount deposited with the Central Bank of Iran exceeds $66 billion. This amount is broken down as follows:
 $35 billion in imported goods (2005–2009),
 $25 billion in oil revenues (2005–2008),
 $2.6 billion in non-oil export revenues,
 $3 billion in foreign exchange reserves.
This is a large number as it is equal one-tenth of Iran's total oil revenues since the 1979 revolution.

Reserves and production

Public projects

As of 2012, the Ministry of Petroleum in Iran handles 4,000 public (non-oil) projects across the country. The estimated value of the projects stands at 53,868 trillion rials (approximately $4 trillion).

Sanctions
The Ministry of Petroleum, in accordance with the US Executive Order 13876, was placed under sanctions by the United States Department of State in October 2020 and has been designated as Specially Designated Global Terrorist due to its alleged links with the Islamic Revolutionary Guard Corps for supplying "oil for terror" in Syria worth millions of dollars.

See also

The nationalization of the Iran oil industry movement
Petroleum industry in Iran
Economy of Iran
International Rankings of Iran in Energy
Iranian Economic Reform Plan
Oil megaprojects

References

External links

Oil & Gas in Iran Brief study (2003)
US Department of Energy Iran's entry
Ministry of Petroleum Overview

1951 establishments in Iran
Ministries established in 1951
Economy of Iran
Energy in Iran
Petroleum
Energy ministries
Iranian entities subject to the U.S. Department of the Treasury sanctions